Love At The Aegean Sea is a romantic Taiwanese drama starring Alec Su, Peter Ho, and Chae Rim.

Storyline
The drama opens with fascinating scenery in Greece, the destination Guan Xiaotong (Chae Rim) and the travel mate she found herself over the Internet, Li Yaoxiang (Peter Ho), are heading to. Arguing with Li time after time in the trip, Guan packs up to return home out of spite. She then meets Lu Enqi (Alec Su), who has been upset with his mother's matchmaking. The two decide to head for the Greek island of Santorini and begin to fall for each other. Their love story, however, does not develop into what they expected, and they begin to fall into the love entanglement with Li.

Cast
 Alec Su 
 Chae Rim 
 Peter Ho

Taiwanese drama television series